The Wizards of Winter is a progressive rock holiday music band from the tri-state area of New York, New Jersey and Connecticut working under the label Breaking Bands, LLC. They are an eclectic group of musicians with strong classical and progressive rock influences woven throughout their musical careers.

History
The Wizards of Winter were formed in 2009 by Scott Kelly, Sharon Kelly and Steve Ratchen as a way to give back to the local community. A holiday concert was held to support a local food pantry which was in severe financial straits. They continued to give back the community through several successful holiday music performances in 2010. In 2011 the band embarked upon writing their own Christmas rock opera, Tales Beneath a Northern Star.

The Wizards of Winter released their own self-titled Christmas rock opera album based on entirely original material in 2014. In 2015, they released their second album, The Magic of Winter, which includes their single featured on Yahoo Music "The Spirit of Christmas". Cover art for both albums was designed by rock cover artist Ioannis.

Throughout their tours, the band supports research for choroideremia through "Angels for Mark" and donates proceeds from sales of their single "March Of The Metal Soldiers" to the Wounded Warrior Project.

The Wizards have toured with five of the original members of Trans-Siberian Orchestra (Tommy Farese, Guy LeMonnier, Tony Gaynor, Michael Lanning and Joe Cerisano). Guy LeMonnier and Tony Gaynor joined the band as an official members in 2014. In 2015 The Wizards of Winter toured with Greg Smith, longtime bassist-vocalist for Ted Nugent. In 2016, Greg Smith joined the band as an official member.

In November 2017, the band released a new single in advance of their tour. "Salzburg Carol" is a medley featuring segments of "My Favorite Things" and "Carol Of The Bells" arranged by keyboardist Scott Kelly.

In June 2018, long-time TSO drummer John O. Reilly joined the Wizards of Winter as a full member.

In September 2018, the band announced that vocalist Guy LeMonnier was not returning for the 2018 tour and welcomed Karl Scully of The Irish Tenors into the band.  Also new to the band's lineup for the 2018 tour were guitarist Chris Green of Tyketto and vocalist Rebecca Graae.

In the Spring of 2019, it was revealed that the band were in the studio to record a new album  and guitarist Steve Brown of Trixter had joined the band. 

September 2019 saw the release of their 10-song album, The Christmas Dream. Music videos were released for "Handel's Torch" and "Secrets of the Snowglobe".  The album includes four instrumental and six vocal songs, with vocalists Sharon Kelly, Karl Scully, and Vincent Jiovino singing lead.   Vincent Jiovino and Karl Scully left the band after the 2019 tour. The band didn't tour in 2020 due to Covid restrictions. The 2021 tour saw the return of  Guy Lemmonier and the introduction of Manny Cabo who was best known for being a Season 9 finalist on NBC's The Voice

Discography
Tales Beneath a Northern Star (2011)
The Wizards of Winter (2014)
The Magic of Winter (2015)
The Christmas Dream (2019)

References

External links 
 of The Wizards of Winter

The Spirit of Christmas on Yahoo Music
Guitar World Interview with Scott Kelly and Fred Gorhau
2019 Interview with The Wizards of Winter

Progressive rock musical groups from New York (state)
Musical groups established in 2009
Christmas music